I Own the Racecourse is a 1985 Australian children's film. It is based on the novel of the same title by Patricia Wrightson.

References

External links
I Own the Racecourse at IMDb

Australian children's films
1980s English-language films
1980s Australian films